William Gorman may refer to:
 William Gorman (politician) (1891–1964), English barrister, judge and politician
 William Gorman (priest) (1826–1916), Anglican priest
 William Henry Gorman (1843–1915), co-founder of the Citizens Bank of Maryland
 William D. Gorman (1920-2009), American politician
 W. M. Gorman (William Moore Gorman, 1923–2003), Irish economist and academic
 Bill Gorman (William Charles Gorman, 1911–1978), Irish footballer